Minisink Valley High School is a secondary school located in Slate Hill, New York.  It contains an enrollment of over 1100 students.
The school, part of the Minisink Valley Central School District, was established in 1958 as a secondary school for grades 7–10.  A junior class established in the 1959-60 school year became the first class to graduate in June 1961.  Over the next decade, enrollment in the school increased so rapidly that in 1971, a bond was passed by district residents to build a new high school adjacent to the original school building. Reginald G. Kierstead High School was completed in 1974, and provided a comfortable home for the upperclassmen of the district.  Additions were made in the years following 9/11 to accompany the expanding class sizes due to suburbanization.  Both high school and middle school buildings have seen recent addition to the response of larger class sizes, along with the completion of new pool and track facilities.

Student Body 
Enrollment at Minisink Valley High School was 1,160 students as of the 2020-2021 school year. The student body was made up of 889 White students, 199 Hispanic students, 52 Black students, 17 Asian students, and 3 Native American students. 291 students were eligible for free or reduced price lunch that year. With 88.8 FTE teachers, there is a student to teacher ratio of 13 to 1.

Athletics 
Boys varsity sports include football, basketball, track and field, cross country, soccer, lacrosse, golf, tennis, wrestling, swimming and diving, and baseball.  Girls varsity sports include basketball, track and field, cross country, soccer, lacrosse, golf, tennis, wrestling, swimming and diving, softball, cheerleading, mat maids, and volleyball.

The Minisink Valley wrestling program is a perennial state level powerhouse, winning dual meet state championships in 2015, 2020, and 2022; as well as setting the team points record at the NYSPHSAA Wrestling Championships in 2022. Individually, 5 Minisink wrestlers have won New York state titles.

The Minisink Valley boys lacrosse program is consistently locally successful as well, most notably having produced former MLL player Joseph Sessa. Sessa went on to win the 2018 NCAA Men's Division I Lacrosse Championship as a member of the Yale Bulldogs

Notable alumni
Nicholas Abruzzese - NHL ice hockey player for the Toronto Maple Leafs
Karl A. Brabenec - New York State Assemblyman - 98th District
Stefanie Dolson - WNBA All-Star, 2020 Olympic gold medalist in women's 3x3 Basketball
Mike Martucci - New York State Senator 42nd District
Dave Telgheder - former MLB player
Jeremy Zuckerman - Multiple Emmy Award-winning composer

Extracurricular activities
The school offers a variety of clubs and extra curricular activities for its students.  Among these is a quarterly Coffee House, hosted by S.A.D.D.  This gathering of student spectators and performers assemble to play music and engage in other various arts to raise money for current charities with money charged for admission.

Notes

External links 
 The Minisink Valley High School Homepage

Schools in Orange County, New York
Public high schools in New York (state)
Wawayanda, New York